This is a list of fatal shark attacks that occurred in United States territorial waters by decade in chronological order.

Before 1800

1800s–1840s

1850s–1860s

1870s

1880s

1890s

1900s

1910s

1920s

1930s

1940s

1950s

1960s

1970s

1980s

1990s

2000s

2010s

2020s

See also 

 Shark attack
 Red Triangle (Pacific Ocean)
 Jersey Shore shark attacks of 1916
 List of fatal shark-incidents in Australia (Australia has the second largest number of reported shark attacks)
 List of fatal shark attacks in California
 List of fatal shark attacks in South African territorial waters

 Species
 Animal attacks
 List of fatal bear attacks in North America
 List of fatal cougar attacks in North America
 List of fatal snake bites in the United States
 List of fatal alligator attacks in the United States
 List of wolf attacks in North America
 Fatal dog attacks in the United States

References 
 Citations

 Bibliography

 
 
 
 
 
 

 General references

External links 
 International Shark File research
 Shark Research Committee
 Shark Attack Survivors Online Database and Shark Attack File
 Shark Attack Data: Graphs detailing incidents in United States of America

Deaths due to shark attacks
Lists of deaths due to animal attacks in the United States